Aputure is a global designer and manufacturer of cinema lighting fixtures, light-shaping accessories and lighting software. Its products are used in studio and on location film sets along with in photography and live production.

History
Aputure was started by Ian Xie, Ted Sim and Helen Liu.
 
The company was founded in 2005 when Xie first began the company as an online electronics store and used his hobbyist knowledge to keep up with camera-related trends and technology. With the growth of this business, Xie started creating small camera accessories like monitors and adapters before moving on to light-emitting diodes also known as LED. During this project, Xie travelled to Los Angeles where he met with Ted Sim and other Los Angeles filmmakers to develop his initial designs. Within three years, the team was contracted by several large cinema manufacturers to begin producing light fixtures under their own in-house brands, many of which became the first-ever companies to introduce LED lighting to studios and production houses.

Origins
The early team joined Xie and Sim with color scientists from Fujifilm and cinematographers from Los Angeles. Together, they engaged in product development of high-fidelity LEDs instead of low color renditioning diodes which were common at the time.

In 2014, Aputure was founded. Its name was a play on combining the cinematography term "aperture" with "future."

First lighting fixtures
Originally, Aputure continued to create light fixtures for other brands. However, the design and manufacturing company soon began developing a product of their own to bring to the market. 

The result was Aputure's first lighting product, the Amaran series of LED panels. Amaran panels were lightweight fixtures that differed from traditional cinema lighting that was almost always heavy and intended exclusively for use by studio crews.

In 2016, Aputure created the Lightstorm series, their first studio-grade line of lighting fixtures. By 2017, they introduced their flagship lights—the Lightstorm 120d and Lightstorm 300d. The Lightstorm 300d has won several awards such as “Best in Show” at major trade shows like NAB.

Organization

Offices and manufacturing
Aputure has offices worldwide, including stages and local support in Los Angeles, Shenzhen, Amsterdam, Singapore, Beijing, Bangalore and São Paulo. Through its in-house design team, the company has been able to design and produce products in other areas of cinematography such as light-shaping accessories and microphones.

Four-Minute Film School
In 2014, Aputure launched a series of educational videos that taught filmmakers how to light both corporate and narrative videos titled Four-Minute Film School. Other series titles include Start Learning Cinematography and Ask Aputure. Hosted by Ted Sim and Valentina Vee, guest instructors have are cinematographers that have worked with Nike, Adidas, and Visa.

Light This Location
In 2019, Aputure announced a global filmmaking competition, Light This Location, with RED Digital Cinema challenging participants to create a short film in a single location. Prizes varied from $250,000 to a million dollars in equipment equivalent prizes. The contest had over a thousand unique entries every year and features celebrity filmmaker judges such as Ryan Connolly, Philip Bloom, and Corridor Digital.

Products

Single-source lights
Aputure is most known for its single-source LED lighting fixtures, also known as point-source, chip-on-board or COB LED lights. Aputure first popularized this style of light fixture with its Light Storm C120t LED fixture. The LS C120t was a tungsten-balanced COB light that utilized the popular Bowens-S mount, which was commonly used in the photography industry. The single light source of the C120t was able to be easily modified and could produce hard shadows, unlike multi-LED array panel lights which were more commonplace at the time. By combining cool-running COB LEDs with the Bowens-S Mount, users could utilize existing photography monolight modifiers, such as reflectors and softboxes with the C120t.

After popularizing the combination of COB and the Bowens Mount, Aputure proceeded to come out with other professional COB lights, such as the LS C120d and LS C300d, which are now in their second generation with the LS C120d II and LS C300d II. Aputure also released smaller point-source lights, such as the mini 20d and mini 20c, which were small single source LEDs with integrated optical focusing systems.

Color-mixing lights
As of 2020, Aputure has announced and released a wide variety of color-mixing LEDs, ranging from bi-color variants to LED fixtures with full RGBWW color control. Color-mixing refers to the act of blending two different LED chipsets, whether the variation is in color temperature or saturated RGB colors, into a cohesive output.

Aputure's variable white color mixing lights includes many bi-color panels such as the Amaran HR672c and the LS 1c, and most recently, an innovatively designed bi-color point source LED, the LS 300x. The LS 300x uses special color-blending optics to mix the color temperatures of the two sets of LEDs used to create the 300x's expanded bi-color CCT range while maintaining its point-source qualities.

Aputure also has a growing number of RGBWW color mixing fixtures. RGBWW stands for Red, Green, Blue, Warm White, & Cool White. This LED configuration allows these lights to replicate nearly any color while maintaining incredibly high color fidelity and white light output. The MC is Aputure's first RGBWW LED, coming in the credit card-sized mini-LED form factor. Aputure has also announced other RGBWW LED lights, including the Nova P300c, the first product in the Nova series and its flagship panel LED, which made its prototype debut in 2017. During NAB 2019, Aputure was also the first film lighting company to announce an RGBWW E27 Smart Bulb designed for filmmaking, now called the Accent B7c.

LED panels
Aside from single source LED lights, the rest of Aputure's product catalog consists of LED panel lights. LED panel lights were the original most common form factor for LED light fixtures, due to the limitations of the LED technology. Now LED panel lights are commonplace for their ability to be used as an area light.

In designing several of its LED panels, Aputure made efforts to reduce the “multi-shadow effect” caused by having vertical or horizontal rows of LEDs, which without any modification could create several obvious shadows after casting light on a subject. This effect was minimized in two ways, the first being with included diffusion filters, which blended the sources together, as well as using more “organic” LED layouts like in the LS1c and Tri-8 lights, which scattered the LEDs to make any shadow variation look more natural.

Aputure's LED panel lights exist in a variety of price points and product lines, ranging from the mini M-Series LEDs, such as the M9, to larger sources, such as the LS 1 and RGBWW Nova Panels.

On-camera lights
One of the first lighting products that Aputure released was the AL-H160 On-Camera LED light, an Amaran series light that provided flexibility in power options that made it convenient for hobbyists and professional ENG camera operators to use their existing batteries (AA or Sony NP-F). As the company grew, Aputure began to introduce more advanced on-camera LED options such as their Halo LED Ring light and their bi-color H198c.

Currently, Aputure's latest flagship on-camera light is the Amaran F7 LED, designed to be used by interviewers and ENG professionals as an incredibly compact and powerful light source, because of its ability to be powered via D-Tap, USB Type-C, or Sony NP-F batteries. By utilizing an expanded bi-color LED architecture (3200K-9500K), the F7 allows users to achieve its brightest output at 5500K, which is the D55 standard for daylight color temperature.

M-Series (mini-LEDs)
Aputure introduced the M9, the first light in its series of mini-LED light panels, in 2016. This super-affordable, lightweight LED light was inspired by a request to make an LED light the size of a credit card for portability and ease of use. After releasing the M9, Aputure continued to release other mini-LED lights, such as the bi-color MX light, and the waterproof MW LED.

In 2019, Aputure proceeded to release its latest mini-LED, the MC. The MC is also Aputure's first RGBWW LED light, allowing for full HSI color control. The MC will also be available in a 4-Light Travel Kit and 12-Light Production Kit, targeted towards indie and professional filmmakers.

Starting with the launch of the MC in 2019, Aputure's line of mini LEDs began to be listed on their website as M-Series LED lights, due to their naming scheme always beginning with an M, and then another letter to signify each light's features.

Sidus Link mobile app control
Starting in 2019, Aputure unveiled the Sidus Link App and Sidus Mesh ecosystem for controlling Aputure lights via a smartphone or tablet. The Sidus Mesh ecosystem is a Bluetooth 5.0 mesh network that allows all compatible Aputure lights to partake in two-way communication between both the light fixture and the smartphone or tablet, as well as between light fixtures. This allows each additional light fixture to increase the range and stability of the network.

The Sidus Link App is available for iOS, Android, and iPad. Through the mobile application, users can control all of their Sidus Compatible lights and gain access to new features such as the Color Picker and Source Match, which allows certain lights to match the color swatch or color temperature scanned by the mobile device's camera.

The LS C300d II was the first Aputure light to be introduced with Sidus Link compatibility, with every subsequent light also being compatible with the Sidus Mesh ecosystem. In 2019, Aputure also announced a product called the Sidus Link Bridge, which would convert the Bluetooth signals to Aputure's 2.4 GHz RF remote protocol, allowing users to also gain smartphone control over compatible legacy Aputure fixtures.

Amaran
The Amaran series of LED lights is Aputure's line of consumer and enthusiast-level LED light fixtures. This product line provides high quality LED sources in a form factor and price point that is more accessible for a budget-conscious audience. However, all of these panel lights still maintain innovative functionality such as expanded bi-color LEDs, and accurate skin tone reproduction, with CRI and TLCI scores of 95+.

In 2021 Aputure added a new line of compact COB lights compatible with the SidusLink app, including both bi-color and fixed-color options.

Light Storm
The Light Storm product family is Aputure's flagship product line, showcasing all of its innovations in COB and point-source lighting technology for the stills & motion picture industry. Beginning with the LS 1 LED panel, the Light Storm product line transitioned into the realm of modifiable point-source lighting with the LS C120t, a tungsten-balanced light that utilized the open-source Bowens-S Mount to provide simple and affordable modifier options for its single-source LED chip. Since the introduction of their first single-source light with the LS C120t, Aputure proceeded to release larger and smaller point-source fixtures such as the 300d and mini-20c, to allow for a wider variety of use cases.

Now, the Light Storm series of products continues to be Aputure's most popular series of lights, featuring fixtures such as the LS C120d II and LS C300d II, which are quickly becoming industry standard light fixtures, especially when combined with their popular Light Dome II parabolic softbox modifier.

Nova
In Aputure's ecosystem, Nova LED lights are classified as professional-quality LED panels, with an emphasis on flexibility by primarily utilizing RGBWW LED engines. The first prototype of a Nova product, the Nova P300c RGBWW LED Softlight Panel, was shown at NAB in 2017, showing Aputure's plans to compete against other leading lighting manufacturers, with high-quality RGB lights at an affordable price point.

Lighting modifiers
Aputure has always been focused on providing versatility with its line of lighting products, to give users flexibility when it comes to creating different qualities of light, by creating innovative both hard and soft-light modifiers for its products.

Bowens mount
As one of the first LED lighting manufacturers to embrace the Bowens mount for modular lighting, Aputure helped to pave the way for modular point-source lighting with LEDs in the film, video, and photo industries. Previously LEDs were only used as panels with wide beam angles that were not as easy to shape or control. Traditionally, tungsten and HMI lights are also point-source lights that are easy to shape with a variety of modifiers, such as barn doors, ellipsoidal spotlights, and softboxes.

By utilizing COB LED technology and combining it with the concept of Bowens mount photography strobes, Aputure was able to create a system that finally allowed for easy modularity and gave users of all skill levels the ability to shape hard light into any quality of light needed.

Soft light modifiers

Light Dome & Light Dome Mini
Aputure's two most popular Bowen's mount accessories are its line of Bowens Mount parabolic softboxes, including the Light Dome and Light Dome Mini. Both of these prolific softboxes were eventually succeeded by the Light Dome II and Light Dome Mini II in 2018, featuring an easier setup process resulting in faster setup times, and a revolutionary gel holder accessory that allowed users to easily use gels with their softboxes. Aputure's introduction of the Light Dome parabolic softbox to the video industry significantly changed how videos were lit both in the professional film industry and in the online video space, particularly on YouTube.

Space Light
Aputure debuted the Space Light attachment at NAB in 2017. Like with traditional tungsten space lights, this attachment was created to take advantage of the wide beam angle of COB lights, and use that to fill a soft volumetric space light for use in studios. The Aputure Space Light could also be used quickly on location due to its lightweight collapsible design, which allowed it to quickly attach to lights in seconds.

Lantern
While it did not replace the Space Light, in 2019, Aputure released the Lantern modifier, a 26-inch China Ball-like spherical softbox modifier that also acted as a large volumetric fill light. The spherical softbox design allows the lantern to be used similarly to the Space Light modifier, with the addition of a fully adjustable 360° skirt to shape the light as necessary. The firm rods of the Lantern also allow it to be used simply as a softbox that can be oriented in any direction.

3rd Party Soft Light Modifiers 
In July 2020, DoPchoice and Aputure announced a joint development in a softbox mount that allows you to use any of the DoPchoice Snapback softboxes on your Aputure NOVA P300c.

Hard light modifiers

Fresnel & Fresnel 2X
The first Fresnel made by Aputure was announced in 2016 at NAB, the first step in allowing you to control your COB point source as a hard light source. Then following user-submitted advice, Aputure released the Fresnel 2X in 2019, making it the first publicly available Aputure product to use a dual-lens system for optimizing light output, while minimizing light leaks.

Barn Doors
Aputure released its Barn Doors accessory in 2018, to work alongside its existing Fresnel and Reflector modifiers for their Bowens Mount Light Storm lights. It was made to fit a 7” diameter, a photography standard, allowing it to be used with a large combination of modifiers, including the Fresnel 2X (released in 2019).

Spotlight Mount
With the release of the Spotlight Mount, Aputure finally made modular, professional-quality ERS-style (ellipsoidal reflector spotlight) modifiers available for LED point source lights. Utilizing a similar dual-lens optical system to the Fresnel 2X, the Spotlight Mount is able to recreate the look of popular spotlights, such as ETC's Source Four, complete with redesigned 19°, 26°, and 36° lenses to minimize color fringing. This style of modifier allows you to precisely shape light, using the built-in shutters and the ability to accept gobos.

Panel modifiers
Many of the first products Aputure released were LED panel lights. Unlike COB point source lights, panel lights are more difficult to shape, because of the initial size of their light source. Therefore, in order to add flexibility to the panels, Aputure developed and co-developed a variety of softboxes to fit their lights, such as the Aputure x Chimera LS1 Lightbank and EZ-Box+ II.

Aputure x Chimera LS1 Lightbank
The Lightbank for the LS1s and LS1c line of panel lights was co-developed by Aputure and Chimera, an industry-standard softbox manufacturer for cinema and photography. The LS1 Lightbank slips over the barn doors of an LS1 panel to maintain the advantage of the LS1's compact size, while still allowing it to deliver soft, professional-quality light. Knowing the importance of controlling soft light, the Lightbank also has a light control grid modifier that can be attached to it.

EZ Box
Aputure released the EZ box to provide a soft light modifier for its mid-sized Amaran series of LED panel lights, such as the HR528, HR 672, and Tri-8. The EZ-Box+ II is currently the primary softbox system for these lights, allowing users to attach two brackets to the side of their light, and quickly build a compact, portable softbox. Like the Chimera Lightbank, it also has a light control grid, for additionally shaping soft light.

Software
Aputure began producing software in 2018, releasing Sidus Link, a free app for Apple iOS and Android devices. The application allows the user's device to operate as a professional wireless lighting board, with a key feature being that it allows users to not only control an unlimited number of fixtures but also save presets and capture colors in real-time using the user's built-in camera.

References

External links
 Aputure.com Official site
 Aputure on Facebook

Chinese brands
Companies based in Shenzhen
Film and video technology
Lighting brands